The  was a limited express train service operated by West Japan Railway Company (JR West) in Japan from 1996 until March 2011.

Service pattern
As of December 2010, there was one return Monju service daily between Shin-Osaka and Amanohashidate, stopping at the following stations.

 –  –  –  –  –  –  –  –  –  –

Rolling stock
This service was operated with 4-car 183 series electric multiple unit trains based at Fukuchiyama Depot. Green (first class) car accommodation was provided in car 1.

History
The Maizuru service was introduced in March 1996.

From 18 March 2007, all cars were made non-smoking.

Maizuru services were discontinued from the start of the 12 March 2011 timetable revision.

References

External links
 JR West Monju 183 series train information 

Named passenger trains of Japan
West Japan Railway Company
Railway services introduced in 1996
Railway services discontinued in 2011